Notodiaptomus is a genus of copepods in the family Diaptomidae. It is the most widely distributed, most abundant and most species-rich genus of freshwater calanoid copepods in the Neotropics. The genus was erected in 1936 by Friedrich Kiefer for eleven species formerly placed in a wider Diaptomus. Notodiaptomus deitersi was chosen to be the type species by Raúl Adolfo Ringuelet in 1958.

The genus Notodiaptomus includes 34 valid species, and two species inquirenda. Its members include the Venezuelan endemic Notodiaptomus maracaibensis and the Brazilian endemic Notodiaptomus dubius, both of which are listed as vulnerable species on the IUCN Red List.

Notodiaptomus amazonicus (S. Wright, 1935)
Notodiaptomus anceps Brehm, 1958
Notodiaptomus anisitsi (Daday, 1905)
Notodiaptomus bidigitatus (Brehm, 1958)
Notodiaptomus brandorffi Reid, 1987
Notodiaptomus carteri (Lowndes, 1934)
Notodiaptomus cearensis (S. Wright, 1936)
Notodiaptomus conifer (G. O. Sars, 1901)
Notodiaptomus coniferoides (S. Wright, 1927)
Notodiaptomus dahli (S. Wright, 1936)
Notodiaptomus deitersi (Poppe, 1891)
Notodiaptomus dentatus Paggi, 2001
Notodiaptomus difficilis Dussart & Frutos, 1987
Notodiaptomus dilatatus Dussart, 1984
Notodiaptomus dubius Dussart, 1986
Notodiaptomus echinatus (Lowndes, 1934)
Notodiaptomus gibber (Poppe, 1889)
Notodiaptomus henseni (F. Dahl, 1894)
Notodiaptomus iheringi (S. Wright, 1935)
Notodiaptomus incompositus (Brian, 1925)
Notodiaptomus inflatus (Kiefer, 1933)
Notodiaptomus isabelae (S. Wright, 1936)
Notodiaptomus jatobensis (S. Wright, 1936)
Notodiaptomus lobifer (Pesta, 1927)
Notodiaptomus maracaibensis Kiefer, 1954
Notodiaptomus nordestinus (S. Wright, 1935)
Notodiaptomus orellanai Dussart, 1979
Notodiaptomus paraensis Dussart & B. A. Robertson, 1984
Notodiaptomus pseudodubius Defaye & Dussart, 1989
Notodiaptomus santaremensis (S. Wright, 1927)
Notodiaptomus simillimus Cicchino, Santos-Silva & Robertson, 2001
Notodiaptomus spinuliferus Dussart, 1986
Notodiaptomus susanae (Paggi, 1976)
Notodiaptomus transitans (Kiefer, 1929)
Notodiaptomus ohlei (Brandorff, 1978) (species inquirenda)
Notodiaptomus santafesinus Ringuelet & Ferrato, 1967 (species inquirenda)

References

Diaptomidae
Taxonomy articles created by Polbot